The Electrical Products Corporation (EPCO) was a major producer of electric signs, especially neon signs, in the western region of the United States.  Electrical Products Corp. was established in Los Angeles, incorporated on November 7, 1912.  By 1923, EPCO had acquired the rights to the neon patents of neon light inventor Georges Claude and began the manufacture of neon lighting and signs.  In 1962 it was acquired by the  Federal Sign and Signal Corporation.

External links
 "The neon sign maker that lit up California", LACurbed, Feb 15, 2019

References

Signage
Signage